"Healing Hands" is a song by English musician Elton John, written by John and Bernie Taupin, from John's 1989 album, Sleeping with the Past. The single was released during late summer 1989 and was a top-20 hit in the United States. A reissued version (paired as a double A-side single with "Sacrifice") became the singer's first solo number-one single in the United Kingdom.

The song was inspired by the Four Tops song "Reach Out, I'll Be There". Produced by Chris Thomas, it was the first of three singles released from the album, with the follow-ups being "Sacrifice" and "Club at the End of the Street".

Release and reception
"Healing Hands" did moderately well as a single in the United States, climbing to  13 on the Billboard Hot 100 and reaching No. 1 on the Billboard Adult Contemporary chart on the week of 21 October 1989. The song failed to make the UK top 40 during its initial release, as did the follow-up, "Sacrifice". However, after Steve Wright of BBC Radio One added "Sacrifice" to his station's playlist, "Sacrifice" was re-released in the UK as a double A-side with "Healing Hands". The double A-side record topped the UK Singles Chart for five weeks starting 23 June 1990, becoming the first solo No. 1 hit of Elton John's career in his native country.

Cash Box reviewed the single saying that "Elton has gone back to basics, and delivers a great song this time, relying only on a piano and his golden throat to get him through."

Music video
The music video filmed in black and white features John singing with backgrounds singers Jackson, Jenkins and Jeter standing on platforms with black flags waving in back of them and even John in a flag as well.

Technical details
Musically, the song is complex, with the intro and verses in the key of B flat major, and the chorus in the key of D major. An instrumental solo, in the related minor key of G (minor), serves as a bridge.

Personnel 
 Elton John – keyboards, lead and harmony vocals
 Guy Babylon – keyboards
 Fred Mandel – keyboards
 Peter Iversen – Fairlight and Audiofile programming
 Davey Johnstone – guitars, backing vocals
 Romeo Williams – bass 
 Jonathan Moffett – drums
 Natalie Jackson – backing vocals
 Mortonette Jenkins – backing vocals
 Marlena Jeter – backing vocals

Charts

Weekly charts

Year-end charts

References

 "Healing Hands", The Billboard Book of Number One Adult Contemporary Hits by Wesley Hyatt, p. 352, Billboard Books (1999).

Elton John songs
1989 singles
1989 songs
MCA Records singles
Music videos directed by Russell Mulcahy
The Rocket Record Company singles
Song recordings produced by Chris Thomas (record producer)
Songs with lyrics by Bernie Taupin
Songs with music by Elton John
UK Singles Chart number-one singles